CYCS may refer to:

Cytochrome c, a protein
Cyclorama (theater) plural - a large curtain or wall, often concave, positioned at the back of the stage area
the ICAO code for Chesterfield Inlet Airport in Nunavut, Canada